

Qualification summary
Although in theory an NOC is entitled to qualify up to one place per road and track event for a total of twenty-two quota places, a limit of 16 riders (10 men, 6 women) is placed on each NOC. For certain countries, therefore, the number of quota places won will significantly exceed the numbers of riders qualified.

Legend
TS — Team Sprint (one team per NOC)
KE — Keirin
SP — Sprint
TP — Team Pursuit (one team per NOC)
OM — Omnium
RR — Road Race
TT — Individual Time Trial
Q — Quotas
RM — Riders (male)
RF — Riders (female)
T — Total

Qualification systems
A total of 228 cyclists can qualify to compete at the games (153 in road and track combined, 37 in mountain biking and 37 in BMX). A nation may enter at most 24 athletes (16 among road and track cycling, four in mountain biking and four in BMX). The host nation (Canada) will automatically enter a full team of 24 athletes (14 male and 10 female), which is included in the numbers below.

Qualification timeline

BMX
A maximum of 23 male and 15 female athletes will be allowed to compete. The host nation automatically receives two quota spots per event, and all other nations may qualify a maximum of two athletes per event. All qualification will be done using the UCI rankings as of December 31, 2014.

Men

Only 22 riders were ranked, so the quota was reduced by one.

Women

Mountain biking
A total of 21 male and 15 female mountain bikers (36 total) will qualify to compete at the games. A country may enter a maximum of two male and two female athletes.

Men

Women

Road cycling
A maximum of 87 male and 67 female may be entered across all events in road and track. A nation may enter only a maximum of ten male and six female in road and track cycling combined, which opens the door to reallocation of unused quotas in both sports if countries qualify more than 16 athletes combined in both events. A maximum of two cyclists in each time trial event may be entered, while a maximum of four men and three women may contest the road races. An athlete qualifying in any road or track event, may contest any other event in either discipline respecting the maximum per event quota for a country.

Men's Road Race

Men's Individual Time Trial

Reallocation

Women's Road Race

Women's Individual Time Trial

Reallocation

Track cycling
A nation may enter up to 16 athletes (ten male and six female). A maximum of two athletes in each gender may be entered in the individual sprint, one in the keirin and omnium, a team of two female (three male) athletes in team sprint and a four-member team pursuit (per gender). As noted above a nation may enter only a maximum of ten male and six female in road and track cycling combined, which opens the door to reallocation of unused quotas. An athlete qualifying in any road or track event, may contest any other event in either discipline respecting the maximum per event quota for a country. A maximum of 87 male and 67 female may be entered across all events in road and track.

Men's Team Sprint
Teams are of 3 riders

Men's Sprint

Men's Keirin

Men's Team Pursuit
Teams are of 4 riders

Men's Omnium

Women's Team Sprint
Teams are of 2 riders

Women's Sprint

Women's Keirin

Women's Team Pursuit
Teams are of 4 riders

Women's Omnium

The women's omnium was not held at the South American Games

References

External links
2014 Pan Am Continental Championships Road cycling results
UCI BMX Rankings

Cycling at the 2015 Pan American Games
2014 in road cycling
2014 in track cycling
Qualification for the 2015 Pan American Games